Corn Stalk may refer to:

 The stem of a maize plant
 Dracaena fragrans or Cornstalk Dracaena, a flowering plant
 Cornstalk, a Shawnee Indian chief during the American Revolution (1720–1777)
 Corn Stalk Defense, a chess opening in the King's Pawn Game

See also
 Stalk (disambiguation)